The Ukraine men's national volleyball team (Cholovicha zbirna Ukrai'ny z volejbolu) represents Ukraine in international volleyball competitions and friendly matches. It is governed by the Ukrainian Volleyball Federation.

Results

World Championship

European Championship

Team

Current roster

See also
Ukraine women's national volleyball team
Ukraine men's national under-21 volleyball team

References

 Ukrainian Volleyball Federation (in Ukrainian)

National men's volleyball teams
V